National Route 39 (Korean: 국도 제39호선, Gukdo Je Samsip-gu(39) Hoseon) is a national highway in South Korea. It connects Buyeo to Gongju, Asan, Hwaseong, Siheung, Bucheon, Seoul, Goyang, and Uijeongbu. National Route 39 opened on 14 March 1981

Main stopovers
South Chungcheong Province
 Buyeo County - Cheongyang County - Gongju - Asan
Gyeonggi Province
 Pyeongtaek - Hwaseong -  Ansan (Sangnok-gu - Danwon-gu) - Siheung - Bucheon
Incheon
 Gyeyang District 
Seoul
 Gangseo District
Gyeonggi Province
 Goyang (Deogyang-gu) - Yangju - Uijeongbu

Major intersections

South Chungcheong 
IS: Intersection, IC: Interchange

Future intersection
  Will be opening in 2020: 
Tangjeong Intersection ~ Hyeonchungsaap Intersection~ Songgok 2 Intersection ~ Seokjeong Intersection ~ Gokgyo Intersection

Gyeonggi (South Seoul)

Seoul - Gimpo - Incheon

Gyeonggi (North Seoul)

Notes

References

39
Roads in South Chungcheong
Roads in Gyeonggi
Roads in Incheon
Roads in Seoul